"Come Close" is a single by rapper Common featuring guest vocals by Mary J. Blige. The song is produced by Chad Hugo and Pharrell's production team, the Neptunes. Peaking at #65 on the Billboard Hot 100, "Come Close" is the only song from Common's 2002 album Electric Circus to make an appearance on the national music chart. It was released in conjunction with a promo video directed by Sanaa Hamri and Questlove of the Roots. The song's lyrics are a loving marriage proposition to Common's then girlfriend Erykah Badu. Jack LV Isles of Allmusic describes it as a "slow-paced dialogue [...] that borders on typical," but will inevitably be a commercial success. Mark Anthony Neal of Pop Matters comments on its mainstream sound saying that it's not a "sell-out" track, just a "fly love song" in which the Neptunes "brought their A-game."

Music video
In the video for the song, Common visits his girlfriend, a deaf woman (although this is not mentioned in the song itself). As she looks outside of her window, Common raps the verses to the song, while using cardboard signs to communicate the meanings of the words to her. After the second verse, he eventually proposes with the lines "I'm tired of the fast lane, I want you to have my last name." His girlfriend gladly accepts and they then drive off.

In the woman's room, behind her bed, there is a poster written in sign language.  If one looks closely, it spells out "COMMON".

This video was nominated at the MTV Video Music Awards 2003 for the MTV2 Award, but it lost to AFI's "Girl's Not Grey."

Remixes
The main remix of this song is titled "Come Close (Remix) (Closer)." It features guest vocals by Erykah Badu, Pharrell and Q-Tip. Produced by J Dilla, it utilizes a sample of "Daylight" by RAMP. It was also remixed by German dance group Boozoo Bajou. This remix is about six minutes long and can be found on their 2003 album Remixes. In 2003, hip hop producer Blackbeard also remixed "Come Close" and released it as a single. In 2005, Dutch hip hop producer Nicolay remixed it for his album The Dutch Masters, Vol. 1. Skillz used the beat for the 2002 Rap Up.

Track listing

CD single
 "Come Close Remix (Closer)" (4:37)
 "Come Close (Album Version)" (4:23)

12-inch single

A-side
 "Come Close to Me (LP)"
 "Come Close to Me (Instrumental)"
 "Come Close to Me (A Cappella)"

B-side
 "I Got a Right Ta (LP)"
 "I Got a Right Ta (Instrumental)"
 "I Got a Right Ta (A Cappella)"

"Come Close Remix (Closer)" CD single

 "Come Close Remix (Closer) (Main)" (4:37)
 "Come Close Remix (Closer) (Instrumental)" (4:37)
 "Come Close (Main)" (4:23)
 "The Hustle (Clean)" (4:20)
 "Aquarius (Clean)" (4:53)
 "Come Close (Multimedia Track)" (3:48)

"Come Close Remix" (Closer)" 12-inch single

A-side
 "Come Close Remix (Closer) (Main)" (4:37)
 "Come Close Remix (Closer) (Instrumental)" (4:37)
 "Come Close Remix (Closer) (A Cappella)" (5:11)

B-side
 "The Hustle (Clean)" (4:20)
 "The Hustle (Instrumental)" (4:19)
 "Aquarius (Clean)" (4:53)
 "Aquarius (Instrumental)" (4:53)

Chart positions

See also
List of Common songs

References

2002 singles
Common (rapper) songs
Mary J. Blige songs
Music videos directed by Sanaa Hamri
Song recordings produced by the Neptunes
Songs written by Chad Hugo
Songs written by Pharrell Williams